Chris or Christopher Ross may refer to:

Christopher Ross (sculptor) (born 1931), American sculptor and designer
Chris Ross (snooker player) (1932–2013), English snooker player
Christopher W. S. Ross (born 1943), American diplomat
L. Chris Ross (born 1951), Pennsylvania politician
Christopher Ross (writer) (born 1960), non-fiction writer and martial artist
Chris Ross (rugby union) (born 1979), Australian rugby union player
Chris Ross (musician), Australian musician
Chris Ross (basketball) (born 1985), Filipino-American basketball player